Urophora anthropovi is a species of tephritid or fruit flies in the genus Urophora of the family Tephritidae.

Distribution
Turkmenistan.

References

Urophora
Insects described in 1992
Diptera of Asia